Rockwell House may refer to:

in the United States (by state then city)
Rockwell House (Norfolk, Connecticut), listed on the National Register of Historic Places (NRHP)
Perkins-Rockwell House, Norwich, Connecticut, NRHP-listed, also known as the Dr. John Rockwell House
Solomon Rockwell House, Winsted, Connecticut, listed on the NRHP in Litchfield County
Stoddard Rockwell House, Lumpkin, Georgia, listed on the NRHP in Stewart County
Samuel Rockwell House, Milledgeville, Georgia, listed on the NRHP in Baldwin County
Bertrand Rockwell House, Kansas City, Missouri, listed on the NRHP in Jackson County
Rockwell House (Dryden, New York), listed on the NRHP in Tompkins County